Whiteite is a rare hydrated hydroxyphosphate mineral.

Whiteite subgroup
The name whiteite refers to three minerals in the jahnsite-whiteite group, whiteite subgroup.  Subgroup members (formulae from IMA):
Whiteite-(CaFeMg), IMA1975-001, CaFe2+Mg2Al2(PO4)4(OH)2·8H2O
Whiteite-(MnFeMg), IMA1978-A, Mn2+Fe2+Mg2Al2(PO4)4(OH)2·8H2O
Whiteite-(CaMnMg), IMA1986-012, CaMn2+Mg2Al2(PO4)4(OH)2·8H2O
Rittmannite, Mn2+Mn2+Fe2+2Al2(PO4)4(OH)2·8H2O
In the whiteite formulae, the symbols in brackets indicate the dominant atom in three distinct structural positions, designated X, M(1), and M(2), in that order; for instance, magnesium Mg is always the dominant atom in the M(2) position for all the whiteite minerals.
Whiteite was named after John Sampson White Jr (born 1933), associate curator of minerals at the Smithsonian Institution, and founder, editor and publisher (1970-1982) of the Mineralogical Record.

Unit cell
All members of the series belong to the monoclinic crystal system with point group 2/m.  Most sources give the space group as P21/a for the Ca Fe rich member, which was the first of the series to be described, but Dana gives it as P2/a.
The other members are variously described in different sources as having space groups P21/a, P2/a or Pa.

There are two formula units per unit cell (Z = 2).  The cell parameters vary slightly between the group members, but to the nearest angstrom they all have a = 15 Å, b = 7 Å and c = 10 Å, with β 112.5 to 113.4.  Individual values are:
Whiteite-(CaFeMg) a = 14.90 Å, b = 6.98 Å, c = 10.13 Å, β = 113.12 
Whiteite-(MnFeMg) a = 14.99 Å, b = 6.96 Å, c = 10.14 Å, β = 113.32 
Whiteite-(CaMnMg) a = 14.842 Å, b = 6.976 Å, c = 10.109 Å, β = 112.59

Appearance
The whiteite minerals are generally brown, pink or yellow, and whiteite-(CaMnMg) may also be light lavender coloured. They are transparent to translucent, with a vitreous luster and a white to brownish white streak.  They occur as aggregates of tabular crystals, or thick tabular canoe-shaped crystals. Whiteite from Rapid Creek in the Yukon, Canada, is often associated with deep blue lazulite crystals (33 out of 49 photos on Mindat.org).

Optical properties
The optical class is thought to be biaxial (+), but whiteite-(CaFeMg) may be biaxial (-).  The refractive indices are Nx = 1.580, Ny = 1.584 to 1.585 and Nz = 1.590 to 1.591, similar to those for quartz.

Physical properties
Whiteite is invariably twinned, giving the crystals a pseudo-orthorhombic appearance, and the cleavage is good to perfect.
Whiteite is quite soft, with hardness 3 to 4, between calcite and fluorite.  Its specific gravity is 2.58, similar to that of quartz.  Whiteite is not radioactive.

Occurrence
The type locality for whiteite-(CaFeMg)and whiteite-(MnFeMg) is the Ilha claim, Taquaral, Itinga, Jequitinhonha valley, Minas Gerais, Brazil, and for whiteite-(CaMnMg) it is the Tip Top Mine (Tip Top pegmatite), Fourmile, Custer District, Custer County, South Dakota, US.  The type material is conserved at the National School of Mines, Paris, France, and at the National Museum of Natural History, Washington DC, US, reference 123013.

At the Lavra da Ilha pegmatite, Taquaral, Brazil, whiteite is found in a complex zoned granite pegmatite associated with eosphorite, zanazziite, wardite, albite and quartz.
At Blow River, the Yukon, Canada, it is found in iron-rich sedimentary rocks with siderite, lazulite, arrojadite and quartz.
At Ilha de Taquaral, Minas Gerais, Brazil, it occurs along joints and fractures in quartz and albite associated with other phosphates.

References

Phosphate minerals
Calcium minerals
Iron(II) minerals
Magnesium minerals
Manganese(II) minerals
Monoclinic minerals
Minerals in space group 13